Yash Mistry  is an Indian child actor who has appeared in television serials. He has made his acting debut in 2013 with Sony TV channel’s historical serial Bharat Ka Veer Putra – Maharana Pratap as Kunwar Vikram. He also played a child lead role of Aditya Rawat in the Colors TV serial Udaan. In 2015 he played the role of little Ram in the mythological series Siya Ke Ram. He played the role of young Sanjay Prince in Meri Durga.

Filmography

References

Year of birth missing (living people)
Living people
Indian male child actors
Indian male television actors
21st-century Indian male actors
Place of birth missing (living people)